ART is an international Arabic general entertainment satellite TV channel, part of the Arab Radio and Television Network. ART is available in the USA, Canada, Caribbean (Canada and Caribbean are available on selection pay-TV provider only), Latin America, Australia, New Zealand, Malaysia and Brunei.

In America, ART America is mix of the best of ART channels, Arab World TV stations programmes and in-house production programmes like Min Beirut, Good Mood, etc. (until 2021). All programmes and ART America's original programmes are available on ART Variety and ART Cable, by the following schedule through time zones.

Original programming
 The Bridge
 Good Mood
 Min Beirut
 New York Doctors
 O² (Oxygen)
 Top 10

Operating Channels
 ART (Formerly known as ART Latino and ART Cable): Arabic general entertainment channel with carried programmes from Lebanon TV channels (Time zones: American Eastern (EST) and Pacific Time (PST))
 ART Tarab (Tarab America): Arabic classic music and opera channel (Time zones: American Eastern Time (EST) and Greenwich Mean Time (GMT))
 ART Movies (ART Movies America): Arabic movie channel (Time zones: American Eastern (EST), Sydney (SYD) and Kuala Lumpur Time (KLU))

Formerly operating channels
 ART Africa
 ART America
 ART Asia
 ART Europe
 ART Teenz Europe
 ART Variety (Formerly known as ART Australia, then it was merged into one)

See also
 Arab Radio and Television Network

Arab mass media